Lauderdale County School District, Lauderdale County School System, or Lauderdale County Schools may refer to:
Lauderdale County School District (Alabama)
Lauderdale County School District (Mississippi)
Lauderdale County School District (Tennessee)